William Hudson (birth unknown) is an English former professional rugby league footballer who played in the 1940s and 1950s, and coached in the 1950s.

Playing career

International honours
Bill Hudson, won caps for England while at Batley in 1946 against Wales, and France, in 1947 against France, while at Wigan in 1949 against France, and won caps for Great Britain while at Wigan in 1949 against Australia.

Bill Hudson, played left-, i.e. number 11, in Great Britain's 23-9 victory over Australia in the third Ashes Test Match at Odsal Stadium, Bradford on Saturday 29 January 1949. Bill Hudson replaced the injured(?) Bob Nicholson of Huddersfield who had played the first and second Ashes Test Matches.

County Honours
Bill Hudson was selected for Yorkshire County XIII while at Batley during the 1946–47 season, and at Wakefield Trinity during the 1950–51 season.

Challenge Cup Final appearances
Bill Hudson played  in Wigan's 8-3 victory over Bradford Northern in the 1947–48 Challenge Cup Final during the 1947–48 season at Wembley Stadium, London on Saturday 1 May 1948, in front of a crowd of 91,465.

County Cup Final appearances
Bill Hudson played  in Wigan's 14-8 victory over Warrington in the 1948–49 Lancashire County Cup Final during the 1948–49 season at Station Road, Swinton on Saturday 13 November 1948, played left-, i.e. number 11, in the 20-7 victory over Leigh in the 1949–50 Lancashire County Cup Final during the 1949–50 season at Wilderspool Stadium, Warrington on Saturday 29 October 1949, and played right-, i.e. number 10, in Wakefield Trinity’s 17-3 victory over Keighley in the 1951–52 Yorkshire County Cup Final during the 1951–52 season at the Fartown Ground, Huddersfield on Saturday 27 October 1951.

Club career
Bill Hudson made his début for Wigan in the 14-3 victory over Rochdale Hornets during the 1947–48 season at Central Park, Wigan on Saturday 8 November 1947, he scored his first try for Wigan in the 34-13 victory over Castleford during the 1947–48 season at Central Park, Wigan on Saturday 21 February 1948, he scored his last try for Wigan in the 33-2 victory over Widnes during the 1949–50 season at Central Park, Wigan on Wednesday 19 April 1950, and he played his last match for Wigan in the 20-2 victory over Huddersfield in the Championship Final during the 1949–50 season at Maine Road, Manchester on Saturday 13 May 1950.

Coaching career

Club career
Bill Hudson was the coach of Featherstone Rovers from 1956 to 1957.

References

External links
Ashes Series 1948 at rugbyleagueproject.org

Living people
Batley Bulldogs players
England national rugby league team players
English rugby league coaches
English rugby league players
Featherstone Rovers coaches
Great Britain national rugby league team players
Place of birth missing (living people)
Rugby league locks
Rugby league players from Yorkshire
Rugby league props
Rugby league second-rows
Wakefield Trinity captains
Wakefield Trinity players
Wigan Warriors players
Year of birth missing (living people)
Yorkshire rugby league team players